Bradly Miller, known artistically as cktrl, is a British multi-instrumentalist and producer.

Biography 
Miller was born to Montserratian parents and was brought up in Lewisham. As a child, he learned the clarinet and saxophone through a free music service funded by the local council. Miller taught himself production and worked at a record store and as a DJ.

cktrl stands for "Can’t Keep to Reality".

Discography

Singles and EPs 

 Forest (EP, 2015)
 Colour (2019)
 Robyn (EP, 2020) 
 "mazes" (2021)
 Zero (EP, 2021)
 Yield (EP, 2022)

References  

British multi-instrumentalists
British people of Montserratian descent
British producers
Living people
Year of birth missing (living people)